Sir David Robert Bell  (born March 1959) is a public policy analyst who is Vice-Chancellor and Chief Executive of the University of Sunderland. He was previously Vice-Chancellor of the University of Reading for six years. Prior to that, he was Permanent Secretary at the Department for Education and its predecessor departments from January 2006 until 2012. Before that he was Chief Inspector of Schools at the Office for Standards in Education from 2002.

Early life and career 
Bell studied history and philosophy at Glasgow University and obtained his Postgraduate Certificate in Education (PGCE) from Jordanhill College of Education. He also has a Master of Education degree in management and administration from Glasgow University. Bell then held teaching posts at primary schools in Glasgow, moving on to become a deputy head, and then a headteacher at Kingston Primary School, in Thundersley, Essex.

Educational administration 
In 1990, Bell became assistant director of education at Newcastle City Council. During this time he spent a year as a Harkness Fellow at Georgia State University, Atlanta, studying education and local government reform across the United States of America. Bell trained as an Ofsted team inspector in 1993. He became a Registered Inspector in 1994 and carried out inspections in primary schools. He was promoted to director of education and libraries at Newcastle City Council in 1995 and became chief executive of Bedfordshire County Council in 2000.

Educational standards 
Bell took up his post as Her Majesty's Chief Inspector of Schools on 1 May 2002. He was Chief Inspector for over three years and, in January 2006, he became Permanent Secretary at the Department for Education and Skills, named the Department for Children, Schools and Families from June 2007, and then the Department for Education from May 2010.

University of Reading 

In September 2012, Bell left the civil service to become the vice-chancellor of the University of Reading. He succeeded Acting Vice-Chancellor Tony Downes.

In 2016 a move to reorganise the structure of Reading University provoked student protests. On 21 March 2016, staff announced a vote of no confidence in Bell, the no-confidence motion being backed by 88% of those who voted.

Bell left the University of Reading in September 2018 and was succeeded by Robert Van de Noort as acting vice-chancellor. Bell had left "under a cloud", according to Times Higher Education when it emerged that Reading had returned a £20 million deficit, largely because of its Malaysia campus.

University of Sunderland 
Bell began his new role as Vice-Chancellor and Chief Executive of the University of Sunderland on 24 September 2018. He announced the closure of history, politics, modern languages and public health courses, and of research in those fields, on 13 January 2020.

Honours 
Bell was appointed Knight Commander of the Order of the Bath (KCB) in the 2011 Birthday Honours and a Deputy Lieutenant of Tyne & Wear in 2020.

Notes

References 

1959 births
Living people
Academics from Glasgow
Knights Commander of the Order of the Bath
Permanent Under-Secretaries of State for Education and Skills
Permanent Under-Secretaries of State for Children, Schools and Families
Vice-Chancellors of the University of Reading
Alumni of the University of Glasgow
Deputy Lieutenants of Tyne and Wear
Presidents of the Association for Science Education